Elizabeth Amos (born 26 May 1938) is an Australian former cricketer. Amos played four Test matches for the Australia national women's cricket team.

References

Living people
Australia women Test cricketers
Australian expatriate sportspeople in England
1936 births
Cricketers from Melbourne